Mormodes lineata is a species of orchid occurring from Oaxaca south to Honduras.

References

External links 

lineata
Orchids of Mexico
Orchids of Central America
Orchids of Belize